Luis Paz (born 31 August 1945) is a Peruvian former freestyle and medley swimmer. He competed in three events at the 1964 Summer Olympics.

References

External links
 

1945 births
Living people
Peruvian male freestyle swimmers
Peruvian male medley swimmers
Olympic swimmers of Peru
Swimmers at the 1964 Summer Olympics
Place of birth missing (living people)
20th-century Peruvian people